T. potens may refer to:
 Thylacinus potens, a prehistoric mammal species
 Titanophoneus potens, a prehistoric synapsid species

See also
 Potens (disambiguation)